Nemophas subterrubens is a species of beetle in the family Cerambycidae. It was described by Heller in 1924. It is known from the Philippines.

References

subterrubens
Beetles described in 1924